Chresiona is a genus of African tangled nest spiders first described by Eugène Simon in 1903.  it contains only three species, all found in South Africa.

References

External links

Endemic fauna of South Africa
Amaurobiidae
Araneomorphae genera
Taxa named by Eugène Simon